White Revolution was a Neo-Nazi hate group that was active in Arkansas from 2002 to 2011. According to the Southern Poverty Law Center, "White Revolution is a neo-Nazi group that employs the most violent language and works with some of the most virulent leaders in the world of white supremacy, while claiming to remain legal."

The group was founded by Billy Joe Roper Jr., a neo-Nazi activist who identifies himself as a "Balkanizer" and a "Purity Spiraler". He founded White Revolution in 2002 as an anti-Semitic group promoting white interests.

Roper now leads the ShieldWall Network, a white nationalist organization with the goal of building a white ethno-state.

References

2002 establishments in Arkansas
2011 disestablishments in Arkansas
Clandestine groups
Neo-Nazi organizations in the United States
White American culture in Arkansas